Johann Heinrich Lambert (Jean-Henri Lambert in French; 26 or 28 August 1728 – 25 September 1777) was a polymath from the Republic of Mulhouse, generally referred to as either Swiss or French, who made important contributions to the subjects of mathematics, physics (particularly optics), philosophy, astronomy and map projections.

Biography
Lambert was born in 1728 into a Huguenot family in the city of Mulhouse (now in  Alsace, France), at that time a city-state allied to Switzerland.  Some sources give 26 August as his birth date and others 28 August.  Leaving school at 12, he continued to study in his free time while undertaking a series of jobs.  These included assistant to his father (a tailor), a clerk at a nearby iron works, a private tutor, secretary to the editor of Basler Zeitung and, at the age of 20, private tutor to the sons of Count Salis in Chur.  Travelling Europe with his charges (1756–1758) allowed him to meet established mathematicians in the German states, The Netherlands, France and the Italian states. On his return to Chur he published his first books (on optics and cosmology) and began to seek an academic post. After a few short posts he was rewarded (1763) by an invitation to a position at the Prussian Academy of Sciences in Berlin, where he gained the sponsorship of Frederick II of Prussia, and became a friend of Euler. In this stimulating and financially stable environment, he worked prodigiously until his death in 1777.

Work

Mathematics

Lambert was the first to introduce hyperbolic functions into trigonometry. Also, he made conjectures about non-Euclidean space. Lambert is credited with the first proof that π is irrational using a generalized continued fraction for the function tan x. Euler believed the conjecture but could not prove that π was irrational, and it is speculated that Aryabhata also believed this, in 500 CE. Lambert also devised theorems about conic sections that made the calculation of the orbits of comets simpler.

Lambert devised a formula for the relationship between the angles and the area of hyperbolic triangles. These are triangles drawn on a concave surface, as on a saddle, instead of the usual flat Euclidean surface. Lambert showed that the angles added up to less than π (radians), or 180°. The amount of shortfall, called the defect, increases with the area. The larger the triangle's area, the smaller the sum of the angles and hence the larger the defect C△ = π — (α + β + γ). That is, the area of a hyperbolic triangle (multiplied by a constant C) is equal to π (in radians), or 180°, minus the sum of the angles α, β, and γ. Here C denotes, in the present sense, the negative of the curvature of the surface (taking the negative is necessary as the curvature of a saddle surface is defined to be negative in the first place). As the triangle gets larger or smaller, the angles change in a way that forbids the existence of similar hyperbolic triangles, as only triangles that have the same angles will have the same area. Hence, instead of the area of the triangle's being expressed in terms of the lengths of its sides, as in Euclidean geometry, the area of Lambert's hyperbolic triangle can be expressed in terms of its angles.

Map projection
Lambert was the first mathematician to address the general properties of map projections (of a spherical Earth). In particular he was the first to discuss the properties of conformality and equal area
preservation and to point out that they were mutually exclusive.
(Snyder 1993  p77). In 1772, Lambert published
seven new map projections under the title Anmerkungen und Zusätze zur Entwerfung der Land- und Himmelscharten, (translated as Notes and Comments on the Composition of Terrestrial and Celestial Maps by Waldo Tobler (1972)).
Lambert did not give names to any of his projections but they are now known as:
 Lambert conformal conic
 Transverse Mercator
 Lambert azimuthal equal area
 Lagrange projection
 Lambert cylindrical equal area
 Transverse cylindrical equal area
 Lambert conical equal area
The first three of these are of great importance. Further details may be found at map projections and in several texts.

Physics
Lambert invented the first practical hygrometer.  In 1760, he published a book on photometry, the Photometria. From the assumption that light travels in straight lines, he showed that illumination was proportional to the strength of the source, inversely proportional to the square of the distance of the illuminated surface and the sine of the angle of inclination of the light's direction to that of the surface. These results were supported by experiments involving the visual comparison of illuminations and used for the calculation of illumination. In Photometria Lambert also cited a law of light absorption, formulated earlier by Pierre Bouguer he is mistakenly credited for (the Beer–Lambert law) and introduced the term albedo. Lambertian reflectance is named after him. He wrote a classic work on perspective and contributed to geometrical optics.

The non-SI unit of luminance, Lambert, is named in recognition of his work in establishing the study of photometry. Lambert was also a pioneer in the development of three-dimensional colour models. Late in life, he published a description of a triangular colour pyramid (Farbenpyramide), which shows a total of 107 colours on six different levels, variously combining red, yellow and blue pigments, and with an increasing amount of white to provide the vertical component. His investigations were built on the earlier theoretical proposals of Tobias Mayer, greatly extending these early ideas. Lambert was assisted in this project by the court painter Benjamin Calau.

Logic and philosophy 
In his main philosophical work, Neues Organon (New Organon, 1764, named after Aristotle's Organon), Lambert studied the rules for distinguishing subjective from objective appearances, connecting with his work in optics. The Neues Organon contains one of the first appearances of the term phenomenology, and it includes a presentation of the various kinds of syllogism. According to John Stuart Mill, 

A modern edition of the Neues Organon was published in 1990 by the Akademie-Verlag of Berlin.

In 1765 Lambert began corresponding with Immanuel Kant.  Kant intended to dedicate the Critique of Pure Reason to Lambert, but the work was delayed, appearing after Lambert's death.

Astronomy 
Lambert also developed a theory of the generation of the universe that was similar to the nebular hypothesis that Thomas Wright and Immanuel Kant had (independently) developed. Wright published his account in An Original Theory or New Hypothesis of the Universe (1750), Kant in Allgemeine Naturgeschichte und Theorie des Himmels, published anonymously in 1755. Shortly afterward, Lambert published his own version of the nebular hypothesis of the origin of the Solar System in Cosmologische Briefe über die Einrichtung des Weltbaues (1761). Lambert hypothesized that the stars near the Sun were part of a group which travelled together through the Milky Way, and that there were many such groupings (star systems) throughout the galaxy. The former was later confirmed by Sir William Herschel. In astrodynamics he also solved the problem of determination of time of flight along a section of orbit, known now as Lambert's problem. 
His work in this area is commemorated by the Asteroid 187 Lamberta named in his honour.

Meteorology 
Lambert propounded the ideology of observing periodic phenomena first, try to derive their rules and then gradually expand the theory. He expressed his purpose in meteorology as follows:

To obtain more and better data of meteorology, Lambert proposed to establish a network of weather stations around the world, in which the various weather configurations (rain, clouds, dry ...) would be recorded – the methods that are still used nowadays. He also devoted himself to the improvement of the measuring instruments and accurate concepts for the advancement of meteorology. This results in his published works in 1769 and 1771 on hygrometry and hygrometers.

Published works 

 Lambert, Johann Heinrich. "Pyrometrie; oder, Vom maasse des feuers und der wȧrme. Mit acht kupfertafeln." Berlin, Bey Haude und Spener, 1779.

See also 
 List of things named after Johann Lambert
 Asteroid 187 Lamberta
 Lambert (Martian crater)

Notes

References

External links 

 Johann Heinrich Lambert (1728-1777): Collected Works - Sämtliche Werke Online
 
 Britannica
 Digitized works  at Université de Strasbourg
 "Mémoire sur quelques propriétés remarquables..." (1761), demonstration of irrationality of π, online and analyzed BibNum (PDF).

18th-century Swiss philosophers
1728 births
1777 deaths
18th-century Swiss astronomers
Swiss male writers
Swiss non-fiction writers
Members of the Prussian Academy of Sciences
Alsatian-German people
Scientists from Mulhouse
Swiss people of Walloon descent
Pi-related people
18th-century German astronomers
18th-century German philosophers
German male writers
18th-century German mathematicians
18th-century Swiss mathematicians
18th-century Swiss writers
Male non-fiction writers